is a Japanese film directed by Shūsuke Kaneko. For her role in this film, actress Rie Miyazawa was given the Nikkan Sports Film Award for Best New Talent. Cinematographer Kenji Takama won the Yokohama Film Festival award for his work in this film.

References

External links
  
 
 

Films directed by Shusuke Kaneko
1989 films
1980s Japanese films